The School of Artillery is the South African Army's specialized artillery training school

History

Origin
Before the establishment of a South African artillery school in 1934 there were a number of earlier artillery training establishments. The first was formed at the Cape in August 1786 with Lt. Louis-Michel Thibault, later better known as an architect, as head of the ‘Militaire School’. It did not operate for long.

Almost a hundred years later an artillery school was proposed by Capt W E Giles, Royal Artillery, in a document submitted to the Cape Colonial Government in March 1880. It was not accepted.

School of Gunnery
On 14 September 1912 when the five regiments of the SA Mounted Rifles were about to be established, a School of Gunnery was opened at Auckland Park, Johannesburg, in the lines of the Transvaal Horse Artillery. Its purpose was to train officers and NCO’s for the first three permanent batteries that were to be established. The school closed down when war broke out in 1914 after only two courses had been completed.

Artillery Training Depot
The next artillery training institution was the Artillery Training Depot, established at Wynberg Camp, Cape Town, in August 1915 to train the artillery batteries that fought in East Africa, and later in Palestine.

Establishment of the Artillery Corps
A corps of South African Artillery was established by proclamation on 1 September 1934 to incorporate all the Permanent and Citizen Force units and on 7 September the two batteries lost their battery status and were formed into an Artillery Training Depot, armed with 4.5 inch howitzers, 18-pdrs and 3.7 inch howitzers.

The Depot staff was responsible for the training of all artillery recruits and all artillery units, except Cape Field Artillery (CFA), which was the responsibility of the Cape Command Training Depot.

Artillery School
By August 1935 the Artillery Training Depot was organized as a Depot Headquarters with three batteries. And on 24 October 1936 the title was altered to that of ‘Artillery School’. War was declared on 6 September 1939 and with no suitable area near Pretoria for gunnery practice, the School moved to Potchefstroom.

During the time the School was at Potchefstroom it underwent various changes of designation and became a unit of the Citizen Force when its title was altered to Artillery and Armoured Corps Training School (V), South African Artillery from 1 January 1944.

When the war was over it was re-established on 14 June 1946 as a Permanent Force unit known as the School of Artillery and Armour. It was housed in the main camp but when 4 Field Training Regiment was formed in 1953 the School moved to the former SA Air Force base below Hospital Hill.

Armour training was moved to Bloemfontein in 1964, and the school became a separate unit known simply as the School of Artillery on 1 February 1964, a name it has since retained.

It was awarded the freedom of Potchefstroom on 10 March 1978.

Training
The School conducts the following training:

Basic Instruction which includes: drill, safety, operation of muzzle loading, procedures for each position of a crew. Students are provided with knowledge of the various artillery systems, knowledge in the areas of observed fire, fire direction, and to manage maintenance.

Advanced Instruction includes: drill, safety, and operation up to battery level.  Students are provided with the knowledge of manoeuvre force, target acquisition, survey, and counter-fire. Also included are typical field gunnery problems, fire direction, observed fire, and firing battery operations.

Officers are trained to manage fire direction operations, target acquisitioning, and deployment, in support management, maintenance and supply procedures, as well as communications/electronics. Officers may be eventually utilised as commanders, fire support officers, or fire direction officers.

Instructors Training: Students may also become Instructors in their own right after a period of time in the Formation.

Sections of the School 

The following subdivisions of the School of Artillery are headed by Chief Instructors or SO1 level senior officers at the rank of lieutenant colonel with the exception of Support Wing which is headed by major: 

 Gunnery Wing (officers training)
 Regimental Training Wing (other ranks training)
 Training and Evaluation Wing (overall training supervisor and quality assurance)
 Management and Second in Command (staff functions including personnel, logistics, finance)
 Support Wing (security, intelligence, quartermaster, base maintenance, chaplaincy, OHS and RHQ)

Equipment

Conventional Artillery

Multiple Rocket Launcher Systems

Unmanned Aerial Vehicle

Insignia

Previous Dress Insignia

Current Dress Insignia

Proficiency badges

SA School of Artillery Leadership

Notes and references

External links 
 SA Gunners' Association

Artillery units and formations of South Africa
Army training units and formations
Military education and training in South Africa
Military units and formations in Potchefstroom
Military units and formations established in 1934
Educational institutions established in 1934
1934 establishments in South Africa